Gennaro Olivieri may refer to:
 Gennaro Olivieri (footballer)
 Gennaro Olivieri (television personality)